Bogo, officially the City of Bogo, is a 6th class component city in the province of Cebu, Philippines. According to the 2020 census, it has a population of 88,867 people.

The plebiscite for the cityhood of Bogo was held on June 16, 2007, in which 97.82% of voters of Bogo voted for cityhood. Former representative Clavel Asas-Martinez announced that the cityhood of Bogo has been ratified. It became the sixth component city of Cebu province.

Government center 

The new Bogo City Hall was inaugurated on April 19, 2013, by President Benigno Aquino III. Later that year, on November 8, a powerful super typhoon Yolanda, also known as Typhoon Haiyan, badly hit northern Cebu, where Bogo City is located, and the city was not spared in the ensuing widespread devastation. Typhoon Yolanda destroyed almost everything from infrastructure to agriculture, with 90% of the populace left homeless, plus thirteen local fatalities among the National death toll of more than 6,000. City Hall was one of the structures damaged: its roof got ripped off, many windows were broken, and other parts of the building were badly damaged.

Cityhood

On June 16, 2007, the municipality Bogo becomes a city in the province of Cebu after ratification of Republic Act 9390.

The Supreme Court declared the cityhood law of Bogo and 15 other cities unconstitutional after a petition filed by the League of Cities of the Philippines in its ruling on November 18, 2008. On December 22, 2009, the cityhood law of Bogo and 15 other municipalities regain its status as cities again after the court reversed its ruling on November 18, 2008. On August 23, 2010, the court reinstated its ruling on November 18, 2008, causing Bogo and 15 cities to become regular municipalities. Finally, on February 15, 2011, Bogo becomes a city again including the 15 municipalities declaring that the conversion to cityhood met all legal requirements.

In 2013, after six years of legal battle, in its board resolution the League of Cities of the Philippines acknowledged and recognized the cityhood of Bogo and 15 other cities on July 19, 2013.

Geography
Bogo City is located in the northeastern coast of Cebu province, on the principal island of Cebu.

Bogo City is bordered on the north by the town of Medellin, to the west by the town of San Remigio, on the east by the Camotes Sea, and on the south by the town of Tabogon.

Barangays

Bogo comprises 29 barangays:

Climate

Demographics

Economy

Culture

Fiestas and festivals
Piyesta sa Bogo
Bogo City celebrates two town fiestas in every year in honor of its patron saint, Saint Vincent Ferrer.
April 5 is the official feast day or the death anniversary of San Vicente Ferrer. Many pilgrims around the world will come to venerate the patron saint and almost all activities in this fiesta are religious activities only.
May 26–27 considered the biggest town fiesta celebration where most visitors come to witness the events, which include the search for Ms Bogo Festival Queen and the celebration of the official festival of Bogo City, the Pintos Festival.  The Pintos Festival involves creative street dancing and ritual showdown depicting the sangi (Planting), the harvest of corn, and the processing of the corn masa into the Pintos, as well as the thanksgiving of the abundant harvest. The festival is also celebrated through merrymaking by dancing the Kuyayang – a Bogohanon courtship dance staged in front of the community during fiestas. Barangays all around Bogo join together to form fives cluster tribes.

Bogo City Charter Day
June 16.

Education

Media

Cable and TV stations
 Bogo Cable TV, Inc.

Major TV networks based in Cebu City have signals in the city

Newspapers

National and local daily newspapers, tabloids and magazines are available in the city.

City of Bogo has its own quarterly official publication "KANAAS" (Gikan sa Amihanan – A Whisper from the North).

Blogs
The Bogo Times

Tourism

 The Archdiocesan Shrine of St. Vincent Ferrer
 The Shrine of the Our Lady of the Miraculous Medal - Lapaz, Bogo City
 Bogo City Hall
 Capitancillo Islet
 Bogo City Plaza Park
 Bogo City Public Library and Museum
 Our Lady of Remedies in Odlot
 Marz Valley Nature Park
 Arapal Nature Retreat

Notable personalities

 Gabriel "Flash" Elorde (1935-1985), professional boxer, world super featherweight champion.
 Marcelo Fernan (1927-1999), held the top position of the two branches of government of the Republic of the Philippines – as Chief Justice of the Supreme Court of the Philippines and then as President of the Senate of the Philippines. 
 Celestino Martinez, authored "RA 7160 – The Local Government Code of the Philippines"
 Vina Morales (born Sharon Garcia Magdayao, 1975) singer, actress and model
 Niel Murillo (born Orlando Murillo IV, 1999) singer, Pinoy Boyband Superstar winner
 Pedro Rodríguez (1869-1932), known as the Grand Old Man of Bogo.
 Sonny Umpad (1948-2006), Filipino eskrimadors
 Fuschia Anne Ravena (born Clyde Dungog, 1995) Miss International Queen 2022 Philippines

City hymn

The Bogo City council has passed an ordinance requiring all schools in Bogo to sing the Bogo Hymn in all flag-raising ceremonies and school programs just like the Philippine National Anthem, "Lupang Hinirang". Radio Stations based in Bogo are also required to play the hymn every sign-on and sign-off. City legislation prohibits the alteration of the lyrics, tempo and tune in the rendition of Bogo hymn entitled "Padayon Bogo".

Notes

References

Sources

External links

 
Townfolks celebrate Bogo’s cityhood

 
Cities in Cebu
Populated places established in 1850
1850 establishments in the Philippines
Component cities in the Philippines